Markus Pieper (born 15 May 1963) is a German politician and member of the European Parliament for Germany. He is a member of the Christian Democratic Union, part of the European People's Party.

Member of the European Parliament, 2004–present
Pieper serves on the Committee on Transport and Tourism and on the Committee on Industry, Research and Energy.

In 2014, Pieper drafted a resolution of the European Parliament calling for more stringent impact assessments before EU legislation is proposed. The resolution, passed with a large majority, backed an idea set out in the Stoiber ‘red tape report’ – drawn up by a high-level group chaired by Edmund Stoiber, former Minister-President of Bavaria –, calling for the creation a high-level advisory body on better regulation. Since 2021, he has been leading the parliament’s work on the revision of the Renewable Energy Directive.

In addition to his committee assignments, Pieper has been a member of the European Parliament Intergroup on Biodiversity, Countryside, Hunting and Recreational Fisheries since 2014.

Other activities
 Energy and Climate Policy and Innovation Council (EPICO), Member of the Advisory Board (since 2021)
 Max Planck Institute for Molecular Biomedicine, Member of the Board of Trustees

References

1963 births
Living people
People from Hamelin
Christian Democratic Union of Germany MEPs
MEPs for Germany 2019–2024
MEPs for Germany 2014–2019
MEPs for Germany 2009–2014
MEPs for Germany 2004–2009